Sultana's Dream is a 1905 Bengali feminist utopian story in English, written by Begum Rokeya, also known as Rokeya Sahkawat Hossain, a Muslim feminist, writer and social reformer from Bengal. It was published in the same year in Madras-based English periodical The Indian Ladies Magazine.

Plot
It depicts a feminist utopia (called Ladyland) in which women run everything and men are secluded, in a mirror-image of the traditional practice of purdah. The women are aided by science fiction-esque "electrical" technology which enables laborless farming and flying cars; the women scientists have discovered how to trap solar power and control the weather. This results in "a sort of gender-based Planet of the Apes where the roles are reversed and the men are locked away in a technologically advanced future."

There, traditional stereotypes such as “Men have bigger brains” and women are "naturally weak" are countered with logic such as "an elephant also has a bigger and heavier brain" and “a lion is stronger than a man” and yet neither of them dominates men. In Ladyland crime is eliminated, since men were considered responsible for all of it. The workday is only two hours long, since men used to waste six hours of each day in smoking. The religion is one of love and truth. Purity is held above all, such that the list of "sacred relations" (mahram) is widely extended.

Origin of the story 
According to Hossain, she wrote Sultana's Dream as a way to pass the time while her husband, Khan Bahadur Syed Sakhawat Hossain, a deputy magistrate, was away on a tour. Her husband was an appreciative audience and encouraged Hossain to read and write in English. Thus, writing Sultana's Dream in English was a way of demonstrating her proficiency in the language to her husband. Sakhawat was very impressed by the story and encouraged Hossain to submit the piece to The Indian Ladies Magazine, which published the story for the first time in 1905. The story was later published in book form in 1908.

Hossain (1880-1932) was born into a rich family who owned land. Though she knew how to read and write in Urdu, she was prevented from learning Bangla and English. In those days, English was seen as a language that would expose girls to new ideas, which society thought unsuitable. Rokeya learned to read and write English and Bangla with the help of her elder sister and elder brother. She wrote Sultana's Dream when she was merely 25 years old. In 1910, she started a school for girls in Kolkata and to this day, the school is in operation.

In artwork 
In 2018, the Indian-American artist Chitra Ganesh created 27 linocuts to illustrate the story.

See also

 Indian English literature
 Social reformers of India
 The Begum's Fortune, an 1879 utopian science fiction novel by Jules Verne
 Kithaab

Notes

References

External links 
 
 Text of Sultana's Dream

Begum Rokeya
Indian literature in English
Utopian novels
Feminist science fiction
1905 science fiction novels
Indian science fiction